is Misia's 12th single. It was released on August 27, 2003. It peaked at #7 selling 36,771 copies in its first week. The song served as theme song for the movie Dragon Head, starring Satoshi Tsumabuki and Sayaka.

Track list

Charts

External links
https://web.archive.org/web/20061117164950/http://www.rhythmedia.co.jp/misia/disc/ — Misia discography

2003 singles
Misia songs
Songs written by Misia
Songs written by Shirō Sagisu
Song recordings produced by Shirō Sagisu
Japanese film songs